Jeevan Mukthi is a 1942 Indian Telugu-language film produced by S. S. Vasan of Gemini Studios.

Plot summary
Jeevudu, an untouchable cobbler, leads a saintly life with his wife Seva and son Bhavudu. Because of his devotion, Lord Vishnu appears before him every day, and eats whatever he is given as a prasad offering.  Santha, the daughter of the proud and powerful Rajaguru, learning of this, visits his hut to discover whether it is true.  When she witnesses it for herself, she informs her father of this wonder.  Angry that his daughter has visited the house of an untouchable, he locks her up.  He then informs Jeevudu that the king's mother was performing a cheppula nomu (Chappal vrata) and needs a thousand sandals by next morning.  Jeevudu and his family work all night, but can only make a few sandals.  They fall asleep from exhaustion; when they awaken the next morning, they find the house full of sandals.

Rajaguru lies to the king, persuading him to order Jeevudu to be imprisoned and to have his hands cut off and his eyes put out; Bhavudu is stoned.  With the help of a flower girl, Santha escapes from the chamber where her father has confined her.  She tells Seva what has happened to her husband and her son.  When Seva goes to the jail and sees her blinded husband, she puts her own eyes out.  At this point, Lord Vishnu and his consort Sridevi appear in the form of tribals.  They restore their devotees; Rajaguru realizes the error of his ways; and all ends happily.

Cast
Cast adapted from the song book

 P. Suribabu as Jeevudu
 Master Viswam as Bhavudu
 Balijepalli Lakshmikantha Kavi as Rajaguru
 D. Lakshmaiah Chowdhary as King
 V. V. Sadagopan as Lord Vishnu
 L. S. Narayana as Yagnenna
 Dr. K. Sivaramakrishnaiah as Somanna
 Madhava Rao as Gruddivadu
 V. Lakshmikantha Kavi as Sachidananda

 C. L. Narasimha Shastri as Brahmananda
 Koteswara Rao as Family Elder
 V. Kondala Rao as Pothudu
 Janardanam as Veeradu
 Bezawada Rajarathnam as Seva
 Kamala Kumari as Santha
 Annapurna as Sridevi
 Santha as Bhudevi
 Lakshmi Devi as Flower Girl

Soundtrack
The music was composed by Rajeswara Rao and the lyrics were written by Balijepalli Lakshmikantha Kavi. There are two songs in the film.
 Aaragimpa Raara Vidu Aaragimpa Raara - P. Suribabu and group
 Veligimpuma Naalo Jyothi Thilakinchaga O Deva - P. Suribabu

References

1940s Telugu-language films
1942 films
Indian black-and-white films
Gemini Studios films